Holly Morris (born September 30, 1965) is an American author, documentary director/producer and television presenter. Her articles have been published in The New York Times Book Review, More, O, Slate, The Daily Telegraph, The Week and other national publications.

Early life
Morris was born in Chicago, Illinois, US. She is the daughter of former professional football player Johnny Morris and Jeannie Morris, a sports reporter and writer. Johnny Morris was a Chicago Bears wide receiver who became a long-time sportscaster for WBBM-TV in Chicago  and a football color commentator with CBS Sports. Jeannie Morris is the author of the best-selling book Brian Piccolo: A Short Season, the story of an American National Football League player who died of cancer at the age of 26.

Career
Filmmaker 

Morris's newest film, Exposure, released in 2022, chronicles a group of women from the Arab world and the West who are making a bid for the North Pole, completely unsupported, in Spring 2018. 

Morris's last film, The Babushkas of Chernobyl, premiered at the Los Angeles Film Festival, where it won the Jury Award for Directing. The film has gone on to win nearly 20 awards on the festival circuit, and has broadcast around the world. The film’s story – of a defiant community of grandmothers who live inside Ukraine’s radioactive “Chernobyl Exclusion Zone” – also forms the basis of her popular TED Talk, and her award-winning and widely syndicated essay on which the film is based (“The Babushkas of Chernobyl” 2011).

Author

She has written and directed several other documentaries that explore the lives of unlikely icons, including, Behind Closed Chadors (Iran), Holy Cow (India), Mana Wahines (New Zealand) and Paradox Found (Cuba) – all broadcast nationally on PBS and in more than 30 countries worldwide as part of the Adventure Divas series.

She is the author of Adventure Divas: Searching the Globe for a New Kind of Heroine (Random House), a New York Times Editor’s Choice, and contributes to many publications, including “O,” The New York Times, The Week and The Independent. Her story about a subculture of illegal ‘Stalkers’ inside the Chernobyl’s Dead Zone appeared in SLATE.

In 2010, her article "A Country of Women" was published. It chronicles a community of "self settlers" who live inside the Chernobyl Exclusion Zone.

Creative Activist

Morris is a longtime host of several television documentary series’ including the PBS’s Globe Trekker, for which she has filmed in dozens of countries including Zambia, Malawi, Niger, Syria, Peru, Bangladesh, Paraguay, Gabon, Uruguay, Ukraine, and Iran.

Morris founded PowderKeg Writers' Residency in Brooklyn, New York, New York.  

Morris is the former Editorial Director of the book publishing company Seal Press, where she edited the Adventura series – ground breaking books about women explorers, travelers, and environmental issues. As an editorial director, she acquired and edited fiction and non-fiction on diverse topics including third wave feminism, health, international politics, and travel.

Personal life
Morris lives in Brooklyn, New York, with her partner Michael Kovnat and their daughter.

Works
As director/producer
 Exposure 
 The Babushkas of Chernobyl
 Adventure Divas -  8 episodes, PBS

As travel host
 Globe Trekker
 Outdoor Investigations
 Treks in a Wild World
 Adventure Divas
 Gringo Trails

As author
 Adventure Divas: Searching the Globe for a New Kind of Heroine (2005, 2006)
 Best Travel Writing: 2013 (2013)
 Best Women's Travel Literature (2013)
 Go Your Own Way (2007)
 100 Places Every Woman Should Go (2007)
 Cuba in Mind (2004)
 Homefield: 9 Writers at Bat (2004)
 A Woman Alone (2001)
 Gifts of the Wild (1998)
 Two in the Wild (1998)
 Another Wilderness (1993)
 Reading the Water (1993)

As editor
 Uncommon Waters: Women Write About Fishing (1991)
 A Different Angle: Fly Fishing Stories by Women (1995, 1996)

As Documentary Subject
 Hedgebrook: Women Authoring Change (2014)

References

External links
 
 
 Pilotguides.com 
 AdventureDivas.com

American television personalities
American women television personalities
American television producers
American women television producers
American non-fiction writers
1965 births
Living people
Writers from Chicago
21st-century American women writers